Anne Osbourn may refer to 
 Anne Osbourn
 Anne G. Osborn
 Anne Osborn Krueger